Jioji Cama, sometimes spelt as Joji Cama (date of birth unknown) is a Fijian former rugby union footballer, he played as a lock.

Career
He was part of the 1987 Rugby World Cup in Australia and New Zealand, although his only cap with the Fijian national team was during the match against the All Blacks in Christchurch, on 27 May 1987, where he scored a try.

Along with Jone Kubu and Fabiano Vakadranu, he played in 1991 for Eastern Suburbs, a rugby union club from Sydney.

Notes

External links
Jioji Cama international statistics at ESPN Scrum

Date of birth unknown
Fijian rugby union players
Fijian expatriates in Australia
Rugby union locks
I-Taukei Fijian people
Fiji international rugby union players